Hartalu Halappa is an Indian politician and member of the Bharatiya Janata Party. Halappa is a member of the Karnataka Legislative Assembly representing the Sagar constituency in Shimoga district. He was Minister of Food, Civil Supplies and Consumer Affairs Minister in B. S. Yeddyurappa's ministry. On 28 July 2020 he was appointed the Chairman of MSIL.

References 

People from Shimoga district
Bharatiya Janata Party politicians from Karnataka
Living people
Karnataka politicians
Karnataka Janata Paksha politicians
Karnataka MLAs 2018–2023
1961 births
Karnataka MLAs 2004–2007
Karnataka MLAs 2008–2013